One Simple Word is the fourth studio album by the American alternative rock band the Connells, released in October 1990.

In the US, the album peaked at #168 on the Billboard 200, where it spent 18 weeks on the chart.  The singles "Stone Cold Yesterday" and "Get A Gun" charted at #3 and #24, respectively, on the Billboard Hot Modern Rock Tracks chart.

Critical reception
Trouser Press called the album the band's "tightest, catchiest and least wimpy effort to date."

Track listing
"Stone Cold Yesterday" (Mike Connell, Doug MacMillan) - 3:57
"Speak To Me" (Connell, MacMillan) - 3:56
"All Sinks In" (Connell) - 3:13
"Get A Gun" (Connell) - 4:23
"What Do You Want?" (George Huntley) - 3:10
"Set the Stage" (Connell) - 5:47
"One Simple Word" (Connell) - 4:21
"Another Souvenir" (MacMillan) - 4:20
"Link" (Huntley) - 1:27
"The Joke" (Huntley) - 3:04
"Too Gone" (Connell, MacMillan) - 2:25
"Waiting My Turn"  (Connell, MacMillan) - 4:37
"Take A Bow" (Connell) - 3:15

Personnel 
The Connells
Doug MacMillan - lead vocals
Mike Connell - guitar, backing vocals; lead vocals on "Waiting My Turn"
George Huntley - guitar, backing vocals, piano; lead vocals on "What Do You Want?", "Link" and "The Joke"
David Connell - bass
Peele Wimberley - drums, percussion

Additional personnel
Robert Lord - keyboards
Caroline Lavelle - cello, vocals
Roddy Lorimer - trumpet
Kate St. John - oboe, English horn, cor anglais
Hugh Jones - background vocals

Technical personnel
Hugh Jones - producer, engineer
Simon Dawson - assistant engineer 
Arun Chakraverty - mastering

References

1990 albums
The Connells albums
TVT Records albums